Expressways in South Korea, officially called as National expressways, are operated by the Korea Expressway Corporation. They were originally numbered in order of construction.  Since August 24, 2001, they have been numbered in a scheme somewhat similar to that of the Interstate Highway System in the United States; the icons of the South Korean Expressways are notably similar to those in the United States because they are shaped like U.S. Highway shields and colored like Interstate shields with red, white, and blue, the colors of the flag of South Korea.
 Arterial routes are designated by two-digit numbers, with north–south routes having odd numbers, and east–west routes having even numbers. Primary routes (i.e. major thoroughfares) have 5 or 0 as their last digit, while secondary routes end in other digits.
 Branch routes have three-digit route numbers, where the first two digits match the route number of an arterial route.
 Belt lines have three-digit route numbers where the first digit matches the respective city's postal code.
 Route numbers in the range 70–99 are not used in South Korea; they are reserved for designations in the event of Korean reunification.
 The Gyeongbu Expressway kept its Route 1 designation, as it is South Korea's first and most important expressway.

List of expressways 
 red backgrounds are not opened to traffic

Numbering scheme until 2001 
A numbering scheme of expressways in South Korea changed in 2001. Before 2001, roads are numbered as order of its approval (although not exactly same). This list below is the lines by the old scheme. Note that name, origin and terminus of some lines are changed with numbering scheme.

Access restrictions

Motorcycling restrictions 

Since June 1, 1972, all motorcycles except police motorcycles are prohibited from driving on expressways in South Korea, regardless of engine displacement. Before 1972, motorcycles with an engine displacement greater than 250 cc were permitted on expressways.

Since March 15, 1992, all motorcycles except police motorcycles have been banned from certain other roads designated for motor vehicles only. These roads are marked by a circular blue sign with a white silhouette of a car.

See also 
 Highway system in South Korea
 National highways of South Korea
 Local highways of South Korea
 Motorways in North Korea

References

External links 
 MOLIT – South Korean Government Ministry of Land, Infrastructure and Transport

 
Roads in South Korea
Lists of places in South Korea
Korea, South
Lists of buildings and structures in South Korea
South Korea transport-related lists